Semprun or Semprún may refer to:

 Carlos Semprún (1926-2009), Spanish writer
 Jaime Semprún (1947–2010), French essayist
 Jorge Semprún (1923–2011), Spanish writer and politician
 José Alejandro Semprún (born 1973), Venezuelan long-distance runners
 Pablo Semprún (born 1964), Spanish tennis and padel tennis player
 Patricia Carola Velásquez Semprún (born 1971), Venezuelan actress and model
 Manuel Semprún y Pombo (1868–1929), Spanish lawyer